Werner Stumpf (15 March 1917 – 13 October 1942) was a Luftwaffe ace and recipient of the Knight's Cross of the Iron Cross during World War II.  Stumpf claimed 48 aerial victories, 2 over the Western Front, 23 over the Eastern Front and 23 over the Mediterranean Front.  The Knight's Cross of the Iron Cross was awarded to recognise extreme battlefield bravery or successful military leadership.

Career
Werner Stumpf joined the Luftwaffe in 1935, he participated in the Battle of France and the Battle of Britain.  During the Battle of Britain he claimed his first two victories.  Stumpf then participated in Operation Barbarossa, during which he claimed another 23 victories.  In late 1941 he participated in the Siege of Malta where he claimed 6 more victories.  During the North African Campaign he added another 17 to his total.  He was awarded the Knight's Cross to the Iron Cross on 13 August 1942.  On 13 October 1942 he was killed by anti-aircraft fire near El Alamein.

Awards
 Flugzeugführerabzeichen
 Front Flying Clasp of the Luftwaffe
 Iron Cross (1939)
 2nd Class
 1st Class
 German Cross in Gold (25 February 1942)
 Knight's Cross of the Iron Cross on 13 August 1942 as Oberfeldwebel and pilot in III./Jagdgeschwader 53

Notes

References

Citations

Bibliography

 
 
 

1917 births
1942 deaths
Luftwaffe pilots
German World War II flying aces
Recipients of the Gold German Cross
Recipients of the Knight's Cross of the Iron Cross
Luftwaffe personnel killed in World War II
Military personnel from Berlin
Aviators killed by being shot down